The Liuzhou Open is a professional tennis tournament played on hard courts. It is currently part of the ATP Challenger Tour and the International Tennis Federation (ITF) Women's Circuit. It has been held annually in Liuzhou, China since 2016.

Past finals

Men's singles

Women's singles

Men's doubles

Women's doubles

External links 
 ITF search

ITF Women's World Tennis Tour
ATP Challenger Tour
Hard court tennis tournaments
Tennis tournaments in China
Recurring sporting events established in 2016